The 1998 German Formula Three Championship was a multi-event motor racing championship for single-seat open wheel formula racing cars that held across Europe. The championship featured drivers competing in two-litre Formula Three racing cars built by Dallara and Martini which conform to the technical regulations, or formula, for the championship. It commenced on 18 April May at Hockenheimring and ended at Nürburgring on 4 October after ten double-header rounds.

Van Amersfoort Racing driver Bas Leinders became the first Belgian champion of the series. He clinched the title, winning seven of 20 races. Robert Lechner won the rookie championship and finished as runner-up with wins on home soil at Salzburgring, losing 21 points to Leinders. Wolf Henzler was victorious at Nürburgring. The other race winners was Pierre Kaffer, Christijan Albers, Timo Scheider, Thomas Jäger and Thomas Mutsch.

Teams and drivers

Calendar
With the exception of round at Salzuburg in Austria, all rounds took place on German soil.

Results

Championship standings

Championship

Junior-Pokal (Rookie) standings

References

External links
 

German Formula Three Championship seasons
Formula Three season
German Formula 3